Ivan Stevanović may refer to:

Ivan Stevanović (footballer) (born 1983), Serbian footballer
Ivan Stevanović (handballer) (born 1982), Croatian handball player